Beck is an American musician, singer-songwriter, and multi-instrumentalist from Los Angeles, California. He has released eleven studio albums: Mellow Gold (1994), Odelay (1996), Mutations (1998), Midnite Vultures (1999), Sea Change (2002), Guero (2005), The Information (2006), Modern Guilt (2008), Morning Phase (2014), Colors (2017), and Hyperspace (2019). The album Mellow Gold was certified Platinum by the Recording Industry Association of America and Odelay was certified double Platinum. Mutations, Midnite Vultures, Sea Change, and Guero were certified Gold.

Beck has won 8 Grammy Awards from 22 nominations, including Album of the Year in 2015 for Morning Phase. The song "Where It's At" received the Best Rock Vocal Performance – Male award and the album Odelay won Best Alternative Music Performance. He has received 6 awards from 15 nominations at the MTV Video Music Awards. In 1997, he received the Best Male Video and Best Editing awards for the song "Devils Haircut", and the song "The New Pollution" earned him Best Art Direction, Best Choreography, and Best Direction, while also receiving nominations for Video of the Year and Best Alternative Video. Overall, Beck has received 18 awards from 54 nominations.

ASCAP Pop Music Awards
The ASCAP Pop Music Awards honors the songwriters and publishers of the most performed pop songs. 

!Ref.
|-
| 1997
| Beck
| College Radio Award
| 
|

American Music Awards
The American Music Awards is an annual awards ceremony created by Dick Clark in 1973. Beck has received one nomination.

|-
|  || Beck || Favorite Pop/Rock Male Artist ||

Antville Music Video Awards

The Antville Music Video Awards are online awards for the best music video and music video directors of the year. They were first awarded in 2005. Beck has received two awards from three nominations.

|-
| 2005
| "E-Pro"
| Best Video 
| 
|-
| rowspan="2" | 2009
| rowspan="2" | "Heaven Can Wait"
| Best Art Direction 
| 
|-
| Video of the Year
|

Berlin Music Video Awards

The Berlin Music Video Awards (BMVA) are an annual festival that puts filmmakers and the art behind music videos in the spotlight.
Supporting both unknown and famous artists, it is a primary networking event for the video and music industries in Europe.

|-
| 2018
| "Up All Night"
| Best Concept 
|

Billboard Music Video Awards
The Billboard Music Video Awards is an annual awards show, founded by the music magazine Billboard and first held in 1989. 

|-
| 1997
| "The New Pollution"
| Alternative/Modern Rock Clip of the Year 
|

Brit Awards
The Brit Awards are the British Phonographic Industry's annual pop music awards. Beck has received three awards.

|-
| 1997 || rowspan="10" | Beck || rowspan="10" | International Male Solo Artist || 
|-
| 1999 || 
|-
| 2000 || 
|-
| 2003 || 
|-
| 2004 || 
|-
| 2006 || 
|-
| 2007 || 
|-
| 2009 || 
|-
| 2015 || 
|-
| 2018 ||

California Music Awards
The California Music Awards is a music and entertainment ceremony founded by BAM (magazine).

|-
| rowspan=3|2000
|rowspan="2"| Midnite Vultures
| Outstanding Album
| 
|-
| Outstanding Pop/Rock Album 
| 
|-
| Himself
| Outstanding Male Vocalist
|

D&AD Awards
Design and Art Direction (D&AD) is a British educational charity which exists to promote excellence in design and advertising. 

|-
| 1997
| "Devils Haircut"
| Pop Promo Video with a budget over 40.000
| style="background:#BF8040"| Wood Pencil
|-
| rowspan=2|2006
| rowspan=2|"Girl"
| Music Video
| style="background:#BF8040"| Wood Pencil
|-
| rowspan=2|Special Effects
| style="background:#BF8040"| Wood Pencil
|-
| rowspan=2|2007
| rowspan=2|"Cellphone's Dead"
| style="background:#BF8040"| Wood Pencil
|-
| Art Direction
| style="background:#BF8040"| Wood Pencil
|-
| 2010
| "Heaven Can Wait"
| Music Video
| style="background:#8a8b89"| Graphite Pencil

Denmark GAFFA Awards
Delivered since 1991. The GAFFA Awards (Danish: GAFFA Prisen) are a Danish award that rewards popular music awarded by the magazine of the same name.

!Ref.
|-
| 1995
| rowspan=2|Himself
| rowspan=2|Best Foreign Solo Act
| 
|rowspan=2|
|-
| 2000
|

Grammy Awards
The Grammy Awards are awarded annually by the National Academy of Recording Arts and Sciences of the United States. Beck has received 8 awards from 22 nominations.

|-
|  || "Loser" ||rowspan="2"|Best Male Rock Vocal Performance || 
|-
|rowspan="3"|  || "Where It's At" || 
|-
|rowspan="2"| Odelay ||  Album of the Year  || 
|-
|rowspan="2"| Best Alternative Music Performance || 
|-
|  || Mutations || 
|-
|rowspan="2"|  ||rowspan="2"| Midnite Vultures || Album of the Year || 
|-
|rowspan="3"| Best Alternative Music Album || 
|-
|  || Sea Change || 
|-
|  || Guero || 
|-
|  || "Nausea" ||rowspan="2"|Best Solo Rock Vocal Performance || 
|-
|  || "Timebomb" || 
|-
|  || Modern Guilt || Best Alternative Music Album || 
|-
|rowspan="4"|  ||rowspan="2"| Morning Phase || Album of the Year || 
|-
| Best Rock Album || 
|-
| rowspan="2"|"Blue Moon" ||Best Rock Performance || 
|-
| Best Rock Song || 
|-
|  || "Up All Night" || Best Music Video || 
|-
| rowspan="3"|2019 || "Colors" ||Best Pop Solo Performance || 
|-
|rowspan="2"|Colors ||Best Alternative Music Album || 
|-
| Best Engineered Album, Non-Classical || 
|-
| rowspan="3"|2021 || rowspan="3"|Hyperspace || Best Alternative Music Album || 
|-
| Best Engineered Album, Non-Classical || 
|-

Hungarian Music Awards
The Hungarian Music Awards (Golden Giraffe Awards, before 2004) is an annual award ceremony held by the Hungarian music industry association Mahasz since 1992.

|-
| 2015
| Morning Phase
| International Alternative Music of the Year
|

London International Awards
The London International Awards are a worldwide awards annually honoring excellence in advertising, digital media, production, design, music & sound and branded entertainment. It was the first international advertising award of its kind to acknowledge all media and methods from around the world to be judged by a diverse global jury.

|-
| 2016
| "Wide Open" (with The Chemical Brothers)
| Best Visual Effects 
|

MTV Europe Music Awards

The MTV Europe Music Awards (EMA) were established in 1994 by MTV Networks Europe to celebrate the most popular music videos in Europe.

|-
| rowspan="2" | 1994
| "Loser"
| Best Song 
|
|-
| rowspan="5" | Himself 
| Best New Act
|
|-
| 1996 
| rowspan="2" | Best Male 
|
|-
| rowspan="2"|1997 
|
|-
| rowspan="2" | Best Alternative
|
|-
| rowspan="2" |2005  
|
|-
| "E-Pro"
| Best Video
|

MTV Video Music Awards
The MTV Video Music Awards is an annual awards ceremony established in 1984 by MTV. Beck has received 6 awards from 15 nominations.

|-
|rowspan="3"| 
|rowspan="3"| "Loser"
| Best Male Video
| 
|-
| Best New Artist
| 
|-
| Best Alternative Video || 
|-
|rowspan="2"| 
|rowspan="2"| "Where It's At"
| Best Male Video
| 
|-
| Best Editing (Editor: Eric Zumbrunnen)
| 
|-
|rowspan="7"| 
|rowspan="5"| "The New Pollution"
| Video of the Year
| 
|-
| Best Alternative Video
| 
|-
| Best Direction (Director: Beck Hansen)
| 
|-
| Best Choreography (Choreographer: Peggy Hickey)
| 
|-
| Best Art Direction (Art Director: K. K. Barrett)
| 
|-
|rowspan="2"| "Devils Haircut"
| Best Male Video
| 
|-
| Best Editing (Editor: Hank Corwin)
| 
|-
| 
| "Deadweight"
| Best Video from a Film (from A Life Less Ordinary)
| 
|-
| 
| "E-Pro"
| Best Male Video
| 
|-
| 
| "Hell Yes"
| Best Special Effects (Special Effects: Hammer & Tongs )
|

MVPA Awards

The MVPA Awards are annually presented by a Los Angeles-based music trade organization to honor the year's best music videos.

|-
| 1998
| "Deadweight"
| Feature Film Video of the Year
| 
|-
| rowspan="3" | 2005
| "Black Tambourine"
| Best Video Produced For Under $25,000
| 
|-
| rowspan="2" |"E-Pro"
| Best Animated Video 
| 
|-
| rowspan="2" |Best Alternative Video
| 
|-
| rowspan="5" | 2006
| rowspan="5" | "Girl"
| 
|-
| Best Director of a Male Artist 
| 
|-
| Best Art Direction
| 
|-
| Best Styling 
| 
|-
| Best Special Effects
| 
|-
| 2007
| "Cellphone's Dead"
| Best Alternative Video
|

Meteor Music Awards

Launched in 2001, the Meteor Music Awards are awarded for achievements in the Irish and international record industry. Beck has received one nomination.

|-
| 2006
| Himself
| Best International Male 
|

NME Awards

The NME Awards were created by the NME magazine and was first held in 1953. Beck has received four awards from seven nominations.

|-
| rowspan="2" | 1997
| Odelay 
| Best LP
|  
|-
| rowspan="4" |  Himself 
| rowspan="3" | Best Solo Artist 
|  
|-
| 1998
|  
|-
| 2000
|  
|-
| 2008
| Best American Alternative/Indie Solo Artist
|  
|-
| 2014
| Song Reader
| Best Book
| 
|-
| 2020
| Himself
| Best Solo Act in the World
|

New Music Awards
The New Music Awards are given for excellence in music to both recording artists and radio stations by New Music Weekly magazine.

|-
| 2018
| Himself
| College Artist of the Year
|

Pollstar Concert Industry Awards
The Pollstar Concert Industry Awards aim to reward the best in the business of shows and concerts. 

|-
| 1997
| Tour 
| Club Tour of the Year 
| 
|-
| 1998
| Tour 
| Small Hall Tour of the Year 
|

Rober Awards Music Poll

|-
| 2014
| Himself
| Comeback of the Year 
|

Soundie Music Video Awards
Soundie Music Video Awards is an international event dedicated to Music Videos held in Barcelona. Since 2016 it has become the occasion to share the best music video works representing international, national and local producers.

|-
| 2017
| "Up All Night"
| Best Catalan Music Video 
|

Space Shower Music Video Awards
The Space Shower Music Video Awards are an annual set of music awards sponsored by Space Shower TV in Japan. 

|-
| 2000
| "Sexx Laws"
| Best International Video 
|

Spike Video Game Awards
The Spike Video Game Awards (VGA) is an annual award show hosted by Spike TV that recognizes the best computer and video games of the year.

|-
| 2012
| "Cities"
| Best Song in a Game
|

UK Music Video Awards

The UK Music Video Awards is an annual award ceremony founded in 2008 to recognise creativity, technical excellence and innovation in music videos and moving images for music. Beck has received four awards from seven nominations.

|-
| 2010
| "Heaven Can Wait"
| Best Indie/Alternative Video
| 
|-
| 2013
| "Hello Again"
| Best Interactive Video
| 
|-
| rowspan="3" | 2016
| rowspan="3" | "Wide Open" (feat. The Chemical Brothers)
| Best Animation 
|  
|-
| Best Visual Effects
| 
|-
| Best Dance Video – UK 
|  
|-
| rowspan="2" | 2017
| rowspan="2" | "Up All Night"
| Best Alternative Video – International 
| 
|-
| Best Styling 
|

Viva Comet Awards
VIVA Comet Awards were an annual awards ceremony, organised by VIVA Germany.

|-
| 2000
| "Sexx Laws"
| Best International Video
|

Webby Awards
A Webby Award is an award for excellence on the Internet presented annually by The International Academy of Digital Arts and Sciences.

|-
| 2018
| Hello, Again: Beck 360 Experience
| Online Film & Video – Best Use of Interactive Video
|

World Music Awards
The World Music Award is an international awards show founded in 1989 that annually honors recording artists based on worldwide sales figures provided by the International Federation of the Phonographic Industry (IFPI).

|-
| 2014
| Himself
| World's Best Live Act 
|

Žebřík Music Awards

!Ref.
|-
| 2005
| Himself
| Best International Male
| 
|

References

External links
 Official website

Beck
Awards